Beach morning glory is a common name for several plants and may refer to:

Calystegia soldanella, with white or pale-pink flowers
Ipomoea imperati, with white flowers
Ipomoea pes-caprae, with pink or purple flowers